Soubin Shahir (born 12 October 1983) is an Indian actor and director who works in Malayalam cinema. He began his film career as an assistant director in 2003 and worked under several directors. Soubin made his acting debut in 2013 with a supporting role in Annayum Rasoolum. He made his directorial debut with the drama Parava (2017). In 2018, he won the Kerala State Film Award for Best Actor for his leading role in Sudani from Nigeria, the film was also a major commercial success.

Early life

Soubin was born and raised in Fort Kochi, Kerala, India. He has a brother and sister. His father Babu Shahir was an assistant director and production controller who had worked in films such as Manichithrathazhu, Godfather, In Harihar Nagar among others.

Career

Soubin started his film career as an assistant director in the industry with Siddique's Chronic Bachelor (2003). He assisted directors like Fazil, Siddique, Rafi-Mecartin, P. Sukumar, Santhosh Sivan, Rajeev Ravi, and Amal Neerad. He made his acting début in Fazil's Kaiyethum Doorath (2002) while working as an assistant director. He got a breakthrough role with Alphonse Putharen's Premam (2015) where he played the role of a PT teacher. This led to his popularity as an actor in the industry. His popular roles include in films Charlie (2015), Maheshinte Prathikaaram (2016), Kali (2016), Darvinte Parinamam (2016), Kammatipaadam (2016), Anuraga Karikkin Vellam (2016), Mayanadhi (2017),  Comrade in America – CIA (2017), and Kumbalangi Nights. His first full lead role was in the film Sudani from Nigeria (2018) for which he won the Kerala State Film Award for Best Actor.S.R. Praveen (27 February 2019). "Kerala State film awards: ‘Kanthan...’, 'Sudani from Nigeria' win honours". The Hindu. Retrieved 27 February 2019.

Personal life

On 16 December 2017, he married his fiancée Jamia Zaheer. Jamia is a marketing professional, based in Kochi. The couple has a son born in May 2019.

Filmography

As actor

As director

Awards and nominations
Won

2018:Kerala State Film Awards for Best Actor (Sudani From Nigeria)
2018: 66th Filmfare Awards South for Best Actor-Critics(Sudani from Nigeria)
2018:Asianet Film Awards for Honorary special award(Parava)
2018:Vanitha Film Awards for Best debut director (Parava)
2017:Asiavision Awards for Best debut director (Parava)
2017:Asianet Comedy Awards -All-rounder award
2015:Asianet Comedy Awards for Best Pair with Vinay Forrt (Premam)

Nominated
2016:1st IIFA Utsavam -Performance in a supporting role (Malayalam) for Chandrettan Evideya
2016:5th South Indian International Movie Awards – Best Comedian (Malayalam) for Premam
2017:6th South Indian International Movie Awards – Best Comedian (Malayalam) for Maheshinte Prathikaaram
2018:Filmfare Award for Best Director – Malayalam for Parava
2018:7th South Indian International Movie Awards -Best director (Malayalam) for Parava
2021:9th South Indian International Movie Awards -Best Supporting Actor (Malayalam) for Kumbalangi Nights

References

Sources

External links 

Male actors in Malayalam cinema
Indian male film actors
Living people
Male actors from Kochi
21st-century Indian male actors
Film directors from Kochi
Malayalam film directors
1983 births
Indian film actors
Indian film directors
Indian producers